Awakening is the fifth studio album by American thrash metal band Sacred Reich, released through Metal Blade Records on August 23, 2019. This is the band's first full-length studio album since Heal (1996), marking the longest gap between Sacred Reich's studio albums, as well as their first release with rhythm guitarist Joey Radziwill, who replaced founding member Jason Rainey right before the recording sessions began.

Critical reception

Awakening was met with generally favorable reviews from critics. At Metacritic, which assigns a weighted average rating out of 100 to reviews from mainstream publications, this release received an average score of 76, based on four reviews.

Track listing

Credits
 Phil Rind – bass, vocals
 Wiley Arnett – lead guitar
 Joey Radziwill – rhythm guitar
 Dave McClain – drums

Charts

References

2019 albums
Sacred Reich albums
Metal Blade Records albums